Stephen Kinsella (born 1978) is an Irish economist. He is Associate Professor of Economics at the University of Limerick's Kemmy Business School in Ireland and a columnist with Ireland's Sunday Business Post. He has written a number of books about the Irish economy. He is associated with the Post Keynesian school of economic thought in general and the development of stock flow consistent models in particular. He co-hosts a podcast Ann & Steve Talk Stuff, with Ann Blake.

Education 
Kinsella has a BA from Trinity College, Dublin, a PhD from NUI, Galway, and a second PhD from the New School for Social Research.

References

1978 births
Living people
21st-century Irish economists
People educated at C.B.C. Monkstown